Bir Masih Saunta (born 7 March 1969) is an Indian politician of the Indian National Congress (AICC). He is a former General Secretary of district Congress committee of Punjab. He was appointed as General Secretary Of Minority Department on 22 November 2015 by Ahmed Kha.

References

1969 births
Living people